Phil Hay is an American screenwriter. His credits include Destroyer, The Invitation, Æon Flux, Clash of the Titans, R.I.P.D., and Ride Along.

Biography
Hay was raised outside of Akron, Ohio. While in college at Brown University, he joined an improv comedy group where he met his future writing partner Matt Manfredi.

Most of his film screenwriting work has been with Manfredi. Their technique for joint screenwriting is to each write separate scenes and trade them to each other for further rewrites. In 2002, Hay and Manfredi directed the film Bug with Manfredi being credited as the sole screenwriter of the film.

Hay has been married to filmmaker Karyn Kusama since 2006. He co-wrote the screenplays for Æon Flux, The Invitation, and Destroyer which were all directed by Kusama. They have one child together.

Filmography

References

External links

 

20th-century births
21st-century American screenwriters
American male screenwriters
Living people
Place of birth missing (living people)
Year of birth missing (living people)
Writers from Akron, Ohio
Screenwriters from Ohio
Brown University alumni
21st-century American male writers